John Thomas Cook (born 1941) is an Australian former professional rugby league footballer from Newcastle, New South Wales.

Early career
He played soccer in his early life and represented New South Wales at under 16 level winning the national championship in 1956. He also won a national championship in Junior Surf Boats for Swansea Caves Beach Surf Life Saving club.

Rugby league
Cook started his first grade career at the Lakes United in Newcastle. He remained there for two seasons and then joined Newtown Jets in 1979. Unable to break into first grade, he moved to South Sydney Rabbitohs for two seasons between 1980, playing one Tooth Cup, one pre-season trial and eight reserve grade games  and 1981, playing two first grade games  and fourteen reserve grade games. He retired at 39 after the 1981 season.

Personal life
Cook is the father of former race car driver Brendon Cook.

References

1941 births
Living people
Australian rugby league players
People from the Hunter Region
Rugby league players from Newcastle, New South Wales
Rugby league props
South Sydney Rabbitohs players